Miras International School Astana is a K–12 international school in Astana, Kazakhstan.

The school opened its doors in 1999 and became the first international school in Kazakhstan authorized for all stages of the International Baccalaureate Programme (International Baccalaureate).

It includes a French section serving levels maternelle (preschool) through lycée (senior high school). It began classes in September 2011.

References

External links

 Miras International School Astana
 School portal
 "Création de l’école française d’Astana " (Archive). Embassy of France in Kazakhstan. 19 April 2011.

International schools in Kazakhstan
French international schools in Europe
French international schools in Asia
Schools in Astana
Educational institutions established in 1999
1999 establishments in Kazakhstan